Darayya is a suburb of Damascus in Syria, the centre of Darayya lying  south-west of the centre of Damascus. Administratively it belongs to Rif Dimashq.

History and population 
Darayya is one of the oldest cities in Syria, reportedly the place where Paul the Apostle had his conversion (30s AD), "on Damascus road". In 1838, Eli Smith noted Daraya as being located in the Wady el-'Ajam, and being populated by Sunni Muslims and Christians. Patriarch Gregory III Laham, the former leader of the Melkite Greek Catholic Church was born here on 15 December 1933 as Lutfy Laham.

The city had a population of 131,501 , making it the 19th largest city per geographical entity in Syria. After 2011, the number of inhabitants decreased gradually, as a result of the conflict between the Syrian government forces and the opposition forces, to seven thousand civilians and combatants until 26 August 2016. After that and as a result of the tight siege imposed on the city, the Syrian government forced the rest of the population to accept forced displacement to the North of Syria, so the city became empty of its residents. Recently, the Syrian government allowed some families to return to their homes after obtaining the necessary security clearances.

Darayya during the war 

Darayya has seen heavy fighting during the Syrian Civil War. The city was an early hotspot for anti-government protests. In August 2012, opposition groups denounced that government forces performed a mass killing that was later known as Darayya massacre, and a second time on 4 January 2013. However, as of summer 2013 fighting continued in the city with most of the municipality controlled by the armed opposition forces.

By mid-2016, the Syrian Army controlled approximately 65% of Darayya, steadily advancing and tightening the siege. In August 2016, an agreement allowed for the evacuation of rebel fighters as well as civilians. Some 700 rebels were safely transported to the rebel stronghold city of Idlib in the north. This agreement was essentially a rebel surrender.

Amid the constant bombings and conflict, a group of young people (mostly former college students) have founded an underground public library that has amassed a collection of more than 15,000 books. Most of the books were found in the rubble of ruined houses, and the librarians are documenting the name of the homeowner so that the books can be returned after the war.

Climate 
Darayya has a cold semi-arid climate (Köppen climate classification: BSk). Rainfall is higher in winter than in summer. About  of precipitation falls annually.

Notable residents
 Yusra Mardini, Olympic swimmer, and her sister, activist Sarah Mardini, grew up in Darayya.

References

Bibliography

External links 
Darayya, Rif Dimashq - Video of bombardment of Darayya during the Syrian civil war on YouTube
Report on Syria's secret library by BBC News

Cities in Syria
Populated places in Darayya District